Kanopy is an on-demand streaming video platform for public and academic libraries that offers films, TV shows and documentaries. The service is free for users, but content owners and content creators are paid on a pay-per-view model by the institution. 

The company was founded in Scarborough, Western Australia on December 25, 2008, moving its headquarters to San Francisco, California a few years later. On June 9, 2021, it was announced that OverDrive had reached a deal to acquire Kanopy. Kanopy's subdivision, Kanopy Kids, includes children's programming; all Kanopy member accounts have access to Kanopy Kids.

History
Kanopy was founded in December 25, 2008 at Scarborough, Western Australia, by Olivia Humphrey, an Australian entrepreneur, as an educational tool for colleges and universities. Until 2010, the company functioned only as a DVD distributor, moving into streaming in that year. After attaining considerable success in Australia, New Zealand, Hong Kong and Singapore, it expanded into the UK and US, and soon afterwards moved its headquarters to San Francisco, with Humphrey remaining as CEO. 

In October 2019, Kevin Sayar succeeded Humphrey as CEO. On June 9, 2021, OverDrive announced that it had reached a deal to acquire Kanopy.

Services
Kanopy provides each participating public library, college and university with a dedicated and customizable website through which members can stream films. The service includes features such as captions, transcripts, clip creation, and playlist creation that allow users to share videos.

Business model
Public library patrons, college and university students and faculty are able to watch Kanopy free-of-charge with their institution's library card. Institutions pay for the films their students and faculty watch on a per-view basis. This model used by libraries is referred to as "patron-driven acquisition" where each view (watching a video for 30 seconds or more) will prompt the sale of a license fee for that title. Costs vary per institutional contract, but have been estimated in 2019 for single titles to be $150 for one year, $350 for a three-year license.

Librarians have access to an administrative dashboard which allows them to view user analytics and adjust budgets.

On July 1, 2019, three of the largest public libraries in the United States—the New York Public Library, the Brooklyn Public Library, and the Queens Public Library—discontinued Kanopy, citing unpredictable and unsustainable costs.

Device support
Kanopy can be viewed on a computer, mobile device, or television via a web browser supporting HTML5 video or the Kanopy app for Amazon Fire Tablet and Fire Stick, Android, Apple iOS, Chromecast and Roku.

See also
Hoopla
OverDrive

References

External links 
  

2008 establishments in Australia
2021 mergers and acquisitions
American companies established in 2008
Companies based in San Francisco
Mass media companies established in 2008
Mass media companies of the United States
Publishing companies based in the San Francisco Bay Area
Publishing companies established in 2008
Streaming media systems
Video on demand services